The Kei–Tanimbar languages are a small group of Austronesian languages spoken on the Kei and Tanimbar islands in the southern Maluku Islands, and on the north side of the Bomberai Peninsula. The languages include:

Kei–Fordata
Kei
Fordata
Yamdena–North Bomberai
Yamdena
North Bomberai
Onin
Sekar
Uruangnirin

Grimes & Edwards add the following languages, previously incertae sedis, and rename the family Tanimbar–Bomberai:
Teor-Kur
Irarutu–Nabi: Irarutu, Kuri (Nabi)
Bedoanas–Erokwanas: Arguni, Bedoanas, Erokwanas

References

Languages of Indonesia
Central Malayo-Polynesian languages